Founded in 1971, Kirksey Architecture began as a small commercial architecture firm and today has evolved into a diverse organization of 12 specialized and practiced groups, each focusing on a particular business segment. Kirksey is headquartered in Houston, Texas on a LEED certified corporate campus.

Kirksey designs high-performance, healthy buildings for all clients. This was formalized through the creation of the EcoServices team, a private think-tank and consulting group whose focus is to mainstream environmentally friendly building practices. The team educates other firm members and the community on green building practices. A basicGREEN program was developed that prescribes sustainable design measures to be implemented on every project, regardless of LEED Certification and at no added cost to the project.

LEED buildings including:
 1st LEED certified building in Houston (Silver, New Construction)
 1st LEED CI in Houston (Silver, Commercial Interiors)
 1st LEED EB in Texas (Existing Building, our own corporate headquarters)
 1st LEED CS (Core and Shell), which is also the 1st Gold certified building, in Houston

Kirksey retrofitted their building to become the first LEED EB (existing building) certified in Texas as well as operating internally as a green company for many years through recycling efforts, tree planting, green cleaning programs, and alternative transportation incentives for employees.

Notable Kirksey projects 

 Kirksey Headquarters, Houston, Texas – LEED for Existing Buildings
 SpawGlass Construction Corporation, Houston, Texas – LEED Silver for New Construction
 American Heart Association, Houston, Texas – LEED Certified for New Construction
 Satterfield and Pontikes Headquarters, Houston, Texas – LEED Gold for Core and Shell
 DNA Westway I, Houston, Texas – LEED Gold for Core and Shell
 HealthSouth Medical Center, "Digital Hospital", Birmingham, Alabama
 Palisade Palms, Galveston, Texas
 University of Texas Health Science Center, South Texas Research Facility, San Antonio, Texas
 University of Houston, Calhoun Lofts, Houston, Texas
 Texas A&M University, Agriculture Headquarters Building, College Station, Texas
 The Houstonian Hotel, Club & Spa, Houston, Texas
 Memorial Hermann Medical Plaza, Houston, Texas
 Texas Woman’s University, Houston, Texas
 Tellepsen Downtown Family YMCA, Houston, Texas
 Astrodome Parking Project, Houston, Texas

Awards

 #1 Largest Houston-Area Green Architect, Houston Business Journal, 2010 
 Houston Business Journal’s Landmark Award for the University of Houston Calhoun Lofts and CITYCENTRE (The Lofts), 2010 
 ASID Design Award, First Place: Hospitality/Restaurant for FiveSeven Grille, 2009
 IIDA Design Excellence Award - Small Corporate for Central Houston Offices, 2009
 Houston Business Journal’s Landmark Award for Yellowstone Academy and Texas Southern University's School of Public Affairs, 2009
 Texas Construction Magazine's Best of 09', Best of Office Projects for Friedkin Companies Campus, 2009
 Houston Business Journal’s Fast 100 Enterprise Champion, 2008
 Mayor’s Proud Partner Award, 2008 
 Greater Houston Partnership, 2008 Quality of Life Visionary Green Building Award
 Houston Business Journal, Houston’s Best Places to Work, 150-500 employees, 2008
 USGBC Outstanding Environmental Team for SYSCO, 2008
 Texas Construction Magazine's Best of 08’, Award of Excellence Higher Education for Houston Community College Learning Hub & Science Center, 2008
 Texas Construction Magazine's Best of 08’, Best of Office/Corporate for Granite Westchase II, 2008
 Greater Houston Partnership’s Houston’s Greatest Mid-Size Company, 2007
 TSA Design Award, Commercial New Construction, 2007
 IIDA Design Excellence Award - Institutional/Education, 2007
 AIA Houston Chapter, Award: Interiors, 2007
 AIA Houston Chapter, Honor Award: Architecture, 2007
 American Subcontractor’s Association, Houston Chapter, A/E Firm of the Year, 2007

References 

"Urban Growth Equals Smart Growth', "Texas Construction," February 1, 2009.
"Designing better places to work among the specialties at Kirksey', "Houston Business Journal," September 26, 2008.
"Giants 300', "Building Design & Construction," July 1, 2008.
"The Growing Importance of LEED-EB', "Texas Real Estate Business," May 1, 2008.
"Top 500 Design Firms 2008', "Engineering News-Record," April 21, 2008.
"2007 #3 Largest Houston-Area Green Architects", page 8b. Houston Business Journal, November 25, 2008.
"2009 #7 Largest Houston-Area Architectural Firms", page 6b. Houston Business Journal, June 5, 2007.
http://www.chron.com/news/houston-texas/article/Harris-County-commissioners-chooses-Kirksey-10808321.php

External links
Kirksey.com

Architecture firms based in Texas
Sustainable building in the United States
Companies based in Houston
1971 establishments in Texas